The Bogotá suburban rail (Spanish: Tren de cercanías de Bogotá), also known as RegioTram, is a transportation project to create a mass and rapid transport system to connect Bogotá with surrounding cities. The railways of the former Bogotá Savannah Railway (which have carried no passenger traffic since 1990) will be rebuilt to create a new tram-train network. Three lines are planned, to the West, North and South of Bogotá.

Planned lines

RegioTram de Occidente 

The first Regiotram line, Regiotram de Occidente, will connect Bogotá with the municipalities of Mosquera, Madrid, Funza, Sector El Corzo and Facatativá in the department of Cundinamarca. 

In February 2019, a Spanish consortium of Ardanuy Ingeniería and FGC was awarded a contract to provide project consultancy and supervision services for this first tram-train line. By August that same year, tendering for the line was launched by the Colombian government with a projected 2024 opening. In January 2020, the contract for construction and operation of Regiotram del Occidente was signed with Chinese company CCECC, with a concession of 26 years.

It will broadly follow the existing railway corridor. However, instead of running to Bogotá La Sabana railway station it will divert to terminate at Calle 26/Avenida Caracas, where it will offer interchange with the Bogotá Metro. Trains will run up to every 6 minutes in peak hours. There is also a possibility of a branch running to El Dorado International Airport.

There will be 18 electric vehicles of electric tram-train design, which will carry up to 884 passengers each at speeds between 28km/h and 70km/h. The line is expected to carry 130,000 passengers daily, or 40m per year.

RegioTram del Norte 
In August 2019, feasibility studies for the Northern Regiotram were announced, financed by the Prosperity Fund of the United Kingdom and the Government of Cundinamarca, supported by an agreement with Findeter. In May 2020, the studies and design contract for the project was signed. The project involves rebuilding the line from Bogotá to Zipaquirá for both freight and light passenger traffic. It is hoped that the line will open in 2024, with the total project costing US$1.5bn.  The line will start at the Centro Comercial Gran Estación in Bogotá, and run for  along the route of the existing railway (used by the Tren Turistico de la Sabana) through Chía and Cajicá to Zipaquirá. It is estimated that it will carry 250,000 passengers per day.

See also 
 Bogotá Metro 
 Tramways of Bogotá 
Bogotá Savannah Railway

References

External links 
 Tren de cercanías - Instituto de Desarrollo Urbano de Bogotá 
 Tren de Cercanías de la Sabana de Bogotá - Study of the project 
 Tren de Cercanías será una realidad en el 2011: Samuel Moreno, retrieved on November 4, 2008.

Rapid transit in Colombia
Passenger rail transport in Colombia
Proposed rail infrastructure in Colombia
Transport in Bogotá